Julius Lind (born 13 September 1977) is a Norwegian jazz and rock bassist.

Career 
Lind took his education at the Jazz program at Trondheim Musikkonsevatorium, and play within the bands "The Gin and tonic youth", "Ape club", "Action&Tension&Space" and "Blow".

Lind also played double bass within the Norwegian rockabilly band "Rex Rudi" (2000–08). He has also played within "Girl from Saskatoon", and in 2010 he appeared within his own Julius Lind Quartet on gigs at clubs like "Herr Nilsen".

Honors 
2013: Sildajazzprisen

Discography 

Within Rex Rudi
2001: Rexmaskin demo
2003: Kampens Hete (Tylden & Co)
2003: Rock'n'Roll Jul (One-Eyed Cat)
2005: Backbeat & Begjær (Norsk Rock)
2008: Så Lenge Det Er Natt (Norsk Rock)
2008: Alt Er Vel (Norsk Rock)

Within Brødrene Löwenstierne
2012: Gå Til Onkel
2013: Brødrene Löwenstierne & Their Calypso Quintet

With others
2006: This Is Only the Beginning within Girl from Saskatoon
2011: New Times within The Gin and Tonic Youth
2013: Action and Tension and Space (Made in Haugesund)
2013: Ape Club (Recorda)

References

External links 
Pris til Julius Lind at Ballade.no (in Norwegian)

Norwegian jazz upright-bassists
Male double-bassists
Jazz double-bassists
Norwegian jazz composers
Male jazz composers
Avant-garde jazz musicians
Norwegian University of Science and Technology alumni
Musicians from Haugesund
1977 births
Living people
21st-century double-bassists
21st-century Norwegian male musicians